

Small arms

Rifles 

De Lisle Carbine - "silenced" design firing subsonic pistol ammunition. Specialist issue, 129 made.
Enfield Pattern 14 (P14) - Used as a marksman weapon until the No. IV Mk. I (T) was introduced, also issued in large number to the British Home Guard. Known as "Rifle No. 3.
M1917 Enfield - Used 30-06 ammunition. Issued to British Home Guard. 
Lee Enfield No.1 Mk.III* - Lee Enfield rifle in service at the beginning of the war, supplemented and replaced by the No.4 Mk.I by mid-war.
Rifle, No.4 Mk.1 and No.4 Mk.I (T) - Lee Enfield rifle that replaced the No.I Mk.III* in larger numbers mid-war.
Lee Enfield No. 5 Mk. I "Jungle Carbine" - Shorter, lighter development of the Lee-Enfield. Introduced in 1944 to replace the No.1 Mk.III* for service in the jungle.

Submachine guns

Lanchester submachine gun - British submachine gun, developed from the German MP28, used by the Royal Navy and the Royal Air Force.
Sten - simple design, low-cost British submachine gun in service from late 1941 to the end of the war. Around four million produced.
Thompson submachine gun - American submachine gun used in large numbers until the Sten gun was introduced.
Sterling/Patchett Machine Carbine Mark 1- British submachine gun first produced in 1944 but only trialled and used in small numbers during the war.

Machine guns 

Bren light machine gun - Light machine gun for infantry use introduced in 1930s and used throughout the whole of the war.
Browning Automatic Rifle (BAR) - Issued to Home Guard
Lewis Gun - In service with some infantry at outbreak of war in small numbers, issued to British Home Guard for the rest of the war.
Vickers "K" machine gun also known as  VGO - Fast firing aircraft machine gun, used in specialist roles on Long Range Desert Group and Special Air Service vehicles in North Africa, as well as a short-lived infantry machine gun with the Commandos.
Vickers machine gun - Standard medium machine gun of the British Army since 1912.
Vickers. 50 - Used as a mounted armament on fighting vehicles, as well as an anti-aircraft weapon by the Royal Navy and other allied ships.
Browning M1919 - Used by multiple countries during the war.
Browning M2 - heavy machine gun, mounted on many lend-lease vehicles.
Besa machine gun - in 7.92 mm BESA and 15 mm BESA forms used as armament on British-built tanks and armoured cars only.
Vickers-Berthier - Light machine gun adopted by British Indian Army before the war, and used until replaced by Bren guns around 1942.
Besal - Designed as a lighter, simpler, and cheaper to manufacture alternative to the Bren gun, never went into mass production.

Handguns 

Enfield No.2 Mk.1 Revolver
Webley Revolver - many marks in .38 and .455 calibres
Browning FN-Inglis "Pistol No.II Mk.I*"
Colt M1911A1
Webley No.I Mk.I - Automatic pistol in .455 inch. Issued to the Royal Navy
Welrod - suppressed pistol
Smith & Wesson Model 10
Colt New Service
Colt Official Police.

Grenades 
Grenade, Hand or Rifle, No.36M Mk.I "Mills Bomb"
"Grenade, Rifle No.68 /AT" high-explosive anti-tank (HEAT) rifle grenade
No.69 Mk.I Bakelite Concussion Hand Grenade
No.76, Special Incendiary Phosphorus Hand Grenade
No.73 Anti-Tank Hand Grenade "Thermos Grenade"
Grenade, Hand, No.74 ST "Sticky Bomb"
No.75 Anti-Tank Hand Grenade "Hawkins Grenade"/"Hawkins Mine"
No.77 White Phosphorus Hand Grenade
Grenade, Hand, No. 82 "Gammon Bomb".

Landmines 

 A.T. Mine G.S. Mark II
A.T. Mine G.S. Mark III
A.T. Mine G.S. Mark IV
A.T. Mine G.S. Mark V
A.T. Mine E. P. Mark II
A.T. Mine E.P. Mark V
A.T. Mine E.P. Mark VI
A.P. Shrapnel Mine Mark I and II
A.P. Mine No. 3
A.P. and Anti-Tire Mine
A.P. Mine E.P. No. 4
A.P. Mine No.5
Mine A.P. Improvised Type I
Mine A.P. Improvised Type II

Other 

No.II Mk.II Flamethrower "Lifebuoy"
Lewes bomb - Used by the SAS
Land Mattress - Multiple rocket launcher
Fairbairn–Sykes fighting knife
Pattern 1907 bayonet
Smatchet
Kukri

Infantry anti-tank weapons 

Blacker Bombard - spigot mortar firing round. Issued for home defence only
Rifle, Anti-Tank, .55in, Boys "Boys Anti-Tank Rifle" - Infantry anti-tank weapon (prewar - 1943).
Projector, Infantry, Anti-Tank (PIAT) - Infantry anti-tank weapon (1943 until end of war).

Artillery

Anti-tank guns 
Ordnance QF 2-pounder - 40 mm weapon used at start of the war
Ordnance QF 6-pounder - 57 mm weapon that replaced 2-pounder in artillery units
Ordnance QF 17-pounder - 76 mm weapon introduced later in war for artillery units

Guns and howitzers 
Ordnance QF 25-pounder  Gun-howitzer
BL 6-inch 26 cwt howitzer
BL 5.5-inch Medium Gun
BL 4.5-inch Medium Field Gun
BL 7.2-inch Howitzer Mk.I
BL 8-inch Howitzer - siege gun
BL 60-pounder gun - 5 inch gun from First World War era, replaced by 4.5 inch gun during war
75 mm Pack Howitzer M1 and M8 - US supplied portable howitzer  for use in mountainous areas
QF 3.7-inch mountain howitzer 
Smith Gun - smoothbore weapon for Home Guard use only
BL 9.2-inch howitzer - WWI era
75 mm gun M1917 - US supplied, training and home defence after fall of France 
QF 18-pounder gun - WWI era, replaced by 25 pdr

Coast defence guns
 QF 6-pounder 10 cwt
 QF 12-pounder
 QF 4.7-inch Mk I–IV
 BL 6-inch Mk VII & Mk XXIV
 BL 7.5-inch Mk VI
 BL 8-inch Mk VIII
 BL 9.2-inch Mk X
 BL 14-inch Mk VII
 BL 15-inch Mk I
Railway guns
 BL 9.2-inch Mk XIII railway gun
 BL 12-inch Mk V railway howitzer
 BL 13.5-inch Mk V railway gun
 BL 18-inch railway howitzer

Anti-aircraft artillery 

QF 3-inch 20 cwt
Oerlikon 20 mm cannon -light anti-aircraft gun
20 mm Polsten - lower cost development of Oerlikon
40 mm Bofors
QF 3.7 inch AA gun
QF 4.5-inch Mark I to Mark V
QF 5.25-inch gun
Z Battery
Unrotated Projectile
Holman Projector

Mortars 

SBML 2-inch Mortar
Ordnance ML 3 inch Mortar
Ordnance ML 4.2 inch Mortar
Blacker Bombard
Northover projector - Home Guard use.

Vehicles

Light tanks

Light Tank Mk VI - The main British light tank during the opening years of the war
Light Tank Mk VII Tetrarch - British produced light tank, most of which did not see service. A small number were supplied via lend-lease to the Soviet Union, and a small number were delivered by glider into Normandy to support British airborne forces.
M3 and M5 Light Tanks - US supplied tank, called the 'Stuart' in British service. Despite the 'official' name of Stuart applied, most British primary sources refer to the tank as the 'Honey'.
Light Tank (Airborne), M22 -US supplied light tank called the 'Locust', was used in small numbers in 1945.
Light Tank, M24 - US supplied tank, called the 'Chaffee' in British service, named after General Adna R. Chaffee Jr.

Medium tanks

Tank, Medium, Mk.II - Dug into ground with turret protruding for defence, in North Africa, & Great Britain.
 Medium Tank M3 - An American tank provided following purchase and later lend-lease. Standard production models were called the 'Lee', after Robert E. Lee. Tanks produced with a modified turret to British specification were called the 'Grant', after Ulysses S. Grant.
 Medium Tank M4 - An American tank provided under Lend-Lease, named Sherman by the British
 Sherman Firefly - A Sherman rearmed with a British 17-pounder anti-tank gun, in addition to accompanying turret modifications.

Cruiser tanks

Tank, Cruiser, Mk.I (A9)
Tank, Cruiser, Mk.II (A10)
Tank, Cruiser, Mk.III (A13)
Tank, Cruiser, Mk.IV (A13 Mk.II)
Tank, Cruiser, Mk.V, Covenanter (A13 Mk.III)  - training use only
Tank, Cruiser, Mk.VI, Crusader (A15) - Entered service in 1941, replacing earlier models in combat formations
Tank, Cruiser, Mk.VII, Cavalier (A24) - Not used as a gun tank in war. Used for training and as an observation post for artillery officers, and as an armoured recovery vehicle.
Tank, Cruiser Mk.VIII, Centaur (A27L) - Initial models were only used for training use. Latter models, equipped with howitzers, were used for close support with only the Royal Marines Armoured Support Group.
Tank, Cruiser, Mk.VIII, Cromwell (A27M) - First saw combat in 1944, and only used in North West Europe. The 7th Armoured Division was the only formation completely equipped with the Cromwell as its main tank. In the remaining British armoured divisions in France, it was used to only equip the armoured reconnaissance regiment.
Tank, Cruiser, Mk.VIII, Challenger (A30) - Derived from Cromwell, enlarged chassis to carry a turret equipped with a 17-pounder anti-tank gun.
Tank, Cruiser, Comet I (A34) - Entered service in early 1945
Tank, Cruiser, Centurion I (A41) - Entered service too late to see combat service.

Infantry tanks

Tank, Infantry, Mk.I, Matilda I
Tank, Infantry, Mk.II, Matilda II
Tank, Infantry, Mk.III Valentine
Tank, Infantry, Mk.IV, Churchill
Tank, Infantry, Valiant - prototype only.
Infantry Tank Black Prince - prototype only.

Other tanks
"Tank, Heavy Assault, A33 (Excelsior)"  - prototype only
Tortoise heavy assault tank - prototype only
Tank, Heavy TOG 1 - prototype only
Tank, Heavy TOG 2 - prototype only

Self-propelled guns

25-pdr SP, tracked, Sexton
Self Propelled 17pdr, Valentine, Mk I, Archer
3inch Self Propelled M10 - Gun Motor Carriage M10, provided under Lend-Lease from America.
17pdr Self propelled M10C - M10 rearmed with 17-pdr gun
AEC Mk I Gun Carrier "Deacon" - 6pdr on armoured wheeled chassis
Carrier, Valentine, 25-pdr gun, Mk.I, Bishop - interim design for 25 pdr on tank chassis
SP 17-pdr, A30 (Avenger) - variant of Cruiser Challenger tank, not delivered to army until post-war.
105 mm SP, Priest - 105 mm Howitzer Motor Carriage M7, provided under Lend-Lease from America.
M3 Gun Motor Carriage  - Provided under Lend-Lease from America. In British service designated "75 mm SP, Autocar".
T48 Gun Motor Carriage - 680 provided by Lend-Lease from America. Many had gun removed to convert them back to armoured personnel carriers.
M14 and M13 Multiple Gun Motor Carriage  - Provided by Lend-Lease from America. Many had guns removed to convert them back to armoured personnel carriers.

Other armoured fighting vehicles 

Universal Carrier
Loyd Carrier
Half-track Car M2 - Provided under Lend-Lease by US.
Half-track Personnel Carrier M3 - Provided under Lend-Lease by US.
Half-track Personnel Carrier M5 - Provided under Lend-Lease by US. effectively same as M3 
Half-track Personnel Carrier M9 - Provided under Lend-Lease by US. effectively same as M5 for same role as M2
4-ton amphibian, Terrapin - amphibious personnel and cargo carrier

Utility vehicles

AEC Matador - 4x4 truck and artillery tractor
Albion CX22S - heavy 6x4 artillery tractor
Austin K2/Y - military ambulance
Austin K5 - heavy truck
Bedford MW - general service truck
Bedford OY - a series of trucks
BSA M20 - motorcycle
Canadian Military Pattern truck - general grouping of Canadian-built trucks by various manufacturers to common specification 
Chevrolet C8A - Canadian-built truck
Ford C11ADF - light truck
Leyland Hippo Mk I - heavy 6x4 general service truck
Leyland Hippo Mk II - heavy 6x4 general service truck
Leyland Retriever 6x4 truck
Morris C8 - "Quad" field artillery tractor
Morris CDSW - 6x4 artillery tractor
Queen Mary trailer - trailer for transport of aircraft and aircraft sections
Scammell Pioneer - heavy 6x4 tractor unit
Standard light utility
Tilly (vehicle) - "Tilly", utility versions of civilian cars.
Willys MB - Willys Jeep

Motorcycles

BSA M20
Norton 16H
Royal Enfield WD/RE - lightweight motorcycle
Welbike - small motorcycle intended for parachute drop

Aerial bombs

Fire balloons
"Bouncing bombs"
Upkeep
Highball
Gas bombs
Smoke bombs
Tallboy bomb
Grand Slam bomb
Blockbuster bombs
Disney bomb

See also
List of British military equipment of World War II

References

Weapons
World War II British
World War II Weapons
World War II
Lists of military equipment